John M. Duncan was born September 26, 1945, in Oak Park, Illinois.

President George W. Bush nominated Duncan to be Assistant Secretary of the Treasury for Legislative Affairs on February 28, 2001.  Duncan served as Administrative Assistant to the former Senator William Roth as well as Majority Staff Director on the Senate Committee on Governmental Affairs between 1984 and 1985.

He is a native of Oak Park, Illinois, and is a veteran of the United States Army. He received his bachelor's degree from the University of Illinois and a master's degree from the Department of Urban Affairs and Policy Analysis at the New School for Social Research in New York.

References

Senate Confirmation Hearings

1945 births
Living people
The New School alumni
People from Oak Park, Illinois